Mamadysh (Mamadış) is a town and the administrative center of Mamadyshsky District in the Republic of Tatarstan, Russia, located on the Vyatka River (Kama's tributary),  from the republic's capital of Kazan. As of the 2010 Census, its population was 14,435.

History
Known since the end of the 14th–the beginning of the 15th century, it has been known as the selo of Troitskoye from the beginning of the 17th century. Town status was granted to it in 1781. It served as the administrative center of a kanton in 1920–1930 and as the administrative center of a district since 1930.

Administrative and municipal status
Within the framework of administrative divisions, Mamadysh serves as the administrative center of Mamadyshsky District, to which it is directly subordinated. As a municipal division, the town of Mamadysh is incorporated within Mamadyshsky Municipal District as Mamadysh Urban Settlement.

Economy
As of 1997, industrial enterprises in the town included a wood-processing factory, a forestry farm, a cotton mill, a brick factory, a butter factory, and a distillery.

Demographics

As of 1989, the population was ethnically mostly Tatar (59.0%) and Russian (39.4%).

References

Notes

Sources

Cities and towns in Tatarstan
Mamadyshsky Uyezd